Ashok Kumar  (28 May 1956 – 15 March 2010) was a British Labour politician who served as Member of Parliament (MP) for Middlesbrough South and East Cleveland from 1997 until his death shortly before the 2010 general election.

Early life
Kumar was born in Haridwar, Uttar Pradesh, India, to Jagat Ram Saini and Santosh Kumari, who emigrated to Derby when Kumar was twelve years of age. He attended Rykneld Secondary Modern School in Derby and left aged 15 to study for O-levels at Wilmorton College, before attending Derby & District College of Art & Technology for his A-Levels. He then studied chemical engineering at Aston University in Birmingham where he was awarded a BSc in 1978, and an MSc in Process Analysis and Control Theory in 1980, and a PhD in Fluid Mechanics in 1982.  The thesis title was Velocity distributions in a plate heat exchanger. He was a Fellow of the Institution of Chemical Engineers, a Chartered Engineer and a Member of the Energy Institute. Kumar was a Research Fellow at Imperial College London (1982–5) and worked as a research scientist for British Steel Corporation in Middlesbrough from 1985 to 1997.

Political career
He began his political career as a local councillor for Middlesbrough Borough Council (1987–97). He became the MP for Langbaurgh at the 1991 Langbaurgh by-election defeating Conservative candidate Michael Bates, but lost the seat to Bates in the 1992 election. He won Middlesbrough South and East Cleveland at the 1997 election, again defeating Bates, and held it until his death in 2010.

He was a Member of the Parliamentary and Scientific Committee; Vice-Chair of Parliamentary Group for Energy Studies; Chair of the Parliamentary Office of Science and Technology (POST); and Chair of Northern Group of Labour MPs.

In June 2010 IChemE (the Institution of Chemical Engineers) and NEPIC (the Northeast of England Process Industry Cluster) launched the Ashok Kumar fellowship at POST in memory of Kumar. The annual fellowship will see the successful candidate spend three months at the Parliamentary Office for Science and Technology (POST). By 2017 the 6th Ashok Kumar Fellow had been appointed to work with POST she was a postgraduate engineering student, Erin Johnson, from Imperial College, London.

Ashok Kumar MP was a supporter of industrial engagement and the concepts of economic clusters. He regularly chaired the NEPIC MP/Industry meetings and contributed to the growth and innovation agenda of the Cluster.  Tributes for his work came after his untimely death.

Personal life
Ashok Kumar was a Distinguished Supporter of the British Humanist Association. Of Hindu and Sikh descent, he described himself as a lifelong "liberal humanist". Aston University gave him an honorary degree in July 1997.

Kumar never married. He lived in Marton, Middlesbrough.

Death
Kumar was found dead by police in his constituency home in Canberra Road, Marton, on 15 March 2010. Police announced that he had died from natural causes.

References

External links
 Personal website
 GuardianUnlimited Politics – Ask Aristotle: Ashok Kumar MP
 TheyWorkForYou.com – Ashok Kumar MP
 BBC Politics 
 The Ashok Kumar Fellowship

1956 births
2010 deaths
20th-century English scientists
Alumni of Aston University
Alumni of the University of Derby
British politicians of Indian descent
British chemical engineers
Electrical, Electronic, Telecommunications and Plumbing Union-sponsored MPs
English humanists
English socialists
Councillors in North East England
Indian emigrants to England
Labour Party (UK) MPs for English constituencies
Naturalised citizens of the United Kingdom
Politicians from Derby
UK MPs 1987–1992
UK MPs 1997–2001
UK MPs 2001–2005
UK MPs 2005–2010
20th-century British engineers